Synchro may refer to:

Sports
Synchromesh, an automobile dog clutch synchronizer mechanism
Synchronized skating
Synchronized swimming

Software
Synchro software, traffic modeling software

Other
Synchro, a rotary electrical motor

See also

Syncro (disambiguation)